Bajardo (also Baiardo) is a comune in the Province of Imperia in the Italian region Liguria.

History
First ruled by the Counts of Ventimiglia, it passed to the Marquis of Ceva before coming under Genoese control in 1259. It remained with Genoa until 1815 when it became part of the Kingdom of Sardinia. The parish church of San Nicolò da Bari in Piazza Parrocchiale  was built in 1893 to replace the church destroyed by the earthquake of 1887.

References

External links
Official website
Tượng Phật Di Lặc

Cities and towns in Liguria